J.J. & Jeff, known in Japan as , is a side scrolling platform game for the TurboGrafx-16. The Japanese version of the game is loosely based on the popular comedy television show Fun TV with Kato-chan and Ken-chan, which American producer Vin Di Bona used as its inspiration for America's Funniest Home Videos in 1990. The game features off-beat characters and enemies, and toilet humor, including flatulence, urination and defecation in the Japanese release. In 2007, the game was re-released on the Wii's Virtual Console in North America on May 28, and in Europe on June 15.

Plot
J.J. & Jeff are bungling detectives in the same vein as Inspector Clouseau. They are out to solve a kidnapping case.  In the Japanese version, Kato-chan & Ken-chan, it is based mostly on the "Detective Story" segments of the show.

Gameplay
At the start, the player chooses either J.J. or Jeff to play. The unchosen character will appear at various moments in the game standing by lampposts and hiding in bushes, but remains unplayable.

There are three ways to attack enemies in J.J. and Jeff. One is to jump on top of them in an attack echoing Super Mario Bros.. The second way is to spray enemies with a can of spray paint. The third is to kick enemies.

The game included six levels (fields) split into four parts, even though the manual says there are a total of 8 levels.

A life bar labeled "Vitality" depletes as the character is injured. Eating food hidden in each level will replenish this meter. Money found can be used to play a slot machine game for items. The slot machine is one of several hidden rooms found in each level. Kicking random objects can produce money, food, and other items.  Extra lives are obtained at 70,000, 150,000, 300,000 and 500,000 points.

Release
The original Japanese game has a heavy emphasis on sophomoric toilet humor, most of which was removed for the American version. For example, in the Japanese version, the spray can was originally Kato and Ken's own flatulence. Also, the unplayable character was originally defecating in the bushes and urinating on lampposts, but the urine was removed, and the character was seen wearing a bear mask in the American version.

Reception
Computer and Video Games reviewed Chan & Chan in 1989, giving it a 91% score. They said it "has got to be one of the rudest and funniest platform games around" with "a myriad of secret screens and bonuses to discover." They recommended that "PC Engine fans shouldn't miss it."

References

External links
 Detailed information for "J. J. and Jeff" at the PC Engine Software Bible
 J.J. & Jeff review - Virtual Console

1987 video games
Hudson Soft games
Platform games
Side-scrolling video games
TurboGrafx-16 games
Video games based on television series
Video games developed in Japan
Video games scored by Takeaki Kunimoto
Virtual Console games
Censored video games
Single-player video games